Isaac Hoffer Doutrich (December 19, 1871 – May 28, 1941) was a Republican member of the U.S. House of Representatives from Pennsylvania.

He was born on a farm near Middletown, Pennsylvania.  He moved to Elizabethtown, Pennsylvania, with his parents in 1880.  He attended Keystone State Normal School in Kutztown, Pennsylvania.  He worked in the retail clothing business in Middletown and Harrisburg, Pennsylvania.  He was also interested in banking and other businesses.  He served as a member of the Harrisburg city council from 1924 to 1927.

Doutrich was elected as a Republican to the Seventieth and to the four succeeding Congresses.  He ran unsuccessfully for reelection in 1936.  After his time in Congress, he reengaged in the retail clothing business in Harrisburg until his death.  Interment in the East Harrisburg Cemetery.

Asked how to say his name, he told The Literary Digest: "Rimes with thou Greek: dou-treek'." (Charles Earle Funk, What's the Name, Please?, Funk & Wagnalls, 1936.)

Sources

The Political Graveyard

1871 births
1941 deaths
Pennsylvania city council members
Kutztown University of Pennsylvania alumni
Democratic Party members of the United States House of Representatives from Pennsylvania
People from Middletown, Pennsylvania